The 1933 All-Southwest Conference football team consists of American football players chosen by various organizations for All-Southwest Conference teams for the 1933 college football season.  The selectors for the 1933 season included the Associated Press (AP).

All Southwest selections

Backs
 Tom Murphy, Arkansas (AP-1 [QB])
 Charles Casper, TCU (AP-1 [HB])
 Robert Wilson, SMU (AP-1 [HB])
 John Kitchens, SMU (AP-1 [FB])

Ends
 Jim Tom Petty, Baylor (AP-1)
 Paul Rucker, Arkansas (AP-1)

Tackles
 Fred Lauterbach, Rice (AP-1)
 Charles Coates, Texas (AP-1)

Guards
 Bud Taylor, TCU (AP-1)
 Harold Clem, Baylor (AP-1)

Centers
 Bill Smith, Texas (AP-1)

Key
AP = Associated Press

See also
 1933 College Football All-America Team

References

All-Southwest Conference
All-Southwest Conference football teams